Peter Rudolf Wyder (26 February 1934-2015) was a Swiss physicist and a professor of experimental solid-state physics at the Radboud University Nijmegen in the Netherlands from 1967 until 1988 and in 1990. Wyder later served as director of the High Field Magnet Laboratory in Grenoble, France.

Life
Wyder was born on 26 February 1934 in Burgdorf. He obtained his PhD at ETH Zurich in 1965 with a doctoral thesis titled: "Freie Weglängen für die elektrische und die thermische Leitfähigkeit". From 1967 he was a professor of experimental solid-state physics at Radboud University Nijmegen. There he worked with the High Field Magnet Laboratory.

Wyder was director of the High Field Magnet Laboratory (GHMFL) in Grenoble, France. The laboratory was founded on the basis of cooperation between the Max Planck Institute for Solid State Research and the French National Centre for Scientific Research. Wyder was director of the Max Planck Institute for Solid State Research between 1984 and 2001. He retired as director of the GHMFL in 2001.

Honours
Wyder was elected a foreign member of the Royal Netherlands Academy of Arts and Sciences in 1985.

PhD student
Wyder's student Jan Hendriks obtained a Nijmegen physics doctorate in 1976 with the thesis Measurements on superconducting films.

Publications

by Wyder
include
 1965: Freie Weglängen für die elektrische und die thermische Leitfähigkeit, doctoral dissertation, ETH Zürich, 1965. Ref.: Olsen, J.L. Also as a journal article in Physik der kondensierten Materie vol. 3, pp 263–291 (1965).
 1981 with J. A. A. J. Perenboom and F. Meier: Electronic properties of small metallic particles, Amsterdam: North-Holland Pub. Co., 1981. Series: Physics reports, v. 78, no. 2. 
 1994: Proceedings of the International Conference on Materials and Mechanisms of Superconductivity - High Temperature Superconductors IV : Grenoble, France, July 5-9, 1994. Pt. 1/2/3/4/5, Amsterdam North-Holland 1994. Series: Physica C, Superconductivity.
 2002 with Robert Kratz: Principles of pulsed magnet design, Berlin; New York: Springer, 2002
 2003 with Israel D. Vagner: Recent trends in theory of physical phenomena in high magnetic fields, Dordrecht: Kluwer Academic Publishers, 2003. Series: NATO science series, Series II, Mathematics, physics and chemistry, vol. 106. Proceedings of the NATO Advanced Research Workshop, Les Houches, France, February 25-March 1, 2002.
 2004, with Israel D. Vagner and Boris I. Lembrikov: Electrodynamics of magnetoactive media, Berlin: Springer, 2004. Series: Springer series in solid-state sciences, 135. 
 2005, with G. Franco Bassani and Gerald Liedl: Encyclopedia of Condensed Matter Physics, Academic Press San Diego: Elsevier Science & Technology Books. Aug. 2005.
 2013, with Klaus Andres and Bruno Lüthi: Ein Pionier der Nanotechnologie : Nobelpreisträgers Heinrich Rohrer, Neue Zürcher Zeitung, Nr. 114, (21.05.2013), S. 12.

for Wyder
 1995, Walter Joss: Physics and magnetic fields: a festschrift to honour professor Peter Wyder on the occasion of his 60th birthday, Amsterdam : North-Holland, 1995. Series: Physica B, vol. 204, no. 1-4 (1995)

References

1934 births
Living people
ETH Zurich alumni
Members of the Royal Netherlands Academy of Arts and Sciences
People from Burgdorf, Switzerland
Academic staff of Radboud University Nijmegen
Swiss physicists